Robert Brooks Brown (born April 14, 1959) is a retired United States Army general who served as commander of the United States Army Pacific. He now serves as president of the Association of the United States Army since September 30, 2021, having joined the organization as executive vice president in January 2021.

Early life and education
Brown graduated from Grosse Pointe North High School in Grosse Pointe, Michigan in 1977. He was commissioned into the United States Army as an Infantry Officer, upon graduating from the United States Military Academy in May 1981. While at West Point, he played for the Army Black Knights men's basketball team under Coach Mike Krzyzewski and was a 1,000 point scorer for the Black Knights. Brown remains close to the coach and even spoke at a USA Basketball camp in Las Vegas, Nevada prior to the 2006 Olympics.

Brown received a Master of Education degree at the University of Virginia and a Master of Science in National Security and Strategic Studies from the National Defense University.

Military career
From June 2003 to December 2005, Brown commanded the 1st Brigade Combat Team (BCT), 25th Infantry Division at Joint Base Lewis–McChord. The 1st BCT, 25th Infantry Division, a Stryker unit, was deployed to Mosul, Iraq from September 2004 to September 2005. Brown led the unit through combat operations and the first elections in a post-Saddam Hussein Iraq. 

From February 2014 to April 2016, Brown was the commanding general United States Army Combined Arms Center headquartered at Fort Leavenworth. 

From 2012 to 2014, Brown was the commanding general of the I Corps headquartered at Joint Base Lewis–McChord.

Brown was serving as commander of the United States Army Pacific until his retirement was announced in September 2019, United States Indo-Pacific Command (USINDOPACOM) bid farewell to him on October 9, and the general officially retired on 1 November 2019.

Awards and decorations

References

|-

1959 births
Living people
United States Military Academy alumni
Curry School of Education alumni
National Defense University alumni
United States Army generals
Commandants of the United States Army Command and General Staff College
Recipients of the Distinguished Service Medal (US Army)
Recipients of the Defense Superior Service Medal
Recipients of the Legion of Merit